Roselle juice, known as bissap, wonjo, foléré, dabileni, tsobo, zobo, or sobolo in parts of Africa, sorrel in the Caribbean, and agua de Jamaica in Mexico, is a drink made out of the flowers of the Roselle plant, a variety of Hibiscus. Although generally the "juice" is sweetened and chilled, it is technically an infusion and when served hot can also be referred to as hibiscus tea.

Description 
Roselle juice, often taken refrigerated, is a cool drink found in many West African countries and the Caribbean. It is a dark red-purple coloured juice. The Burkinabes, Senegalese,  and Ivorians call it bissap while the Ghanaians and Nigerians call it sobolo. It tastes a bit grapey and a little like cranberry juice and can be served with mint leaves. It can also be served with any flavouring of one's choice — sometimes with orange essence or ginger, pineapple juice, tea grass, vanilla, and many others. In Ghana, Nigeria, and Senegal, roselle juice is served cold, while in Egypt, it is served warm.

Preparation
Roselle juice is prepared with water, bissap flowers, sugar and sometimes other flavouring ingredients such as ginger.
Wash your bissap flowers in clean water.
Either pour boiling water over the flowers, or put flowers into water and allow to boil, or soak in water overnight.
If mixing with tea grass, you can boil together with the leaves.
If using boiling method, remove from fire.
Drain with a strainer to separate flowers from flavoured water. 
Sweeten to taste with sugar (if not using pineapple juice).
Allow to cool before adding other ingredients.
You may add pineapple juice and other ingredients at this point. 
Allow to cool if it is still hot, then refrigerate and serve.

Health benefits 
Roselle juice, which acts as a diuretic, has been shown to regulate blood pressure and reduce hypertension. It also has high levels of vitamin C, so is used to treat the common cold and otherwise boost the immune system. Some studies have also shown antimicrobial activity.

Zobo drink 

Zobo drink is a local beverage drink in Nigeria. It is made from dried hibiscus leaf and other ingredients. The drink is common in the Northern region however, it can be found in all parts of the country ranging from restaurants, malls to minimarts. Roselle drinks are served at parties occasions and it can be taken as family beverage drink.

Overview 
Hibiscus drink is made by boiling the hibiscus leaf alongside ginger, garlic for less than an hour. It is served hot or chilled depending on the weathered condition of the area it was produced. Other ingredients used in making zobo drink include nutmeg, cinnamon, cloves, lime and artificial colours. The particles are sieved leaving behind the zobo juice. The Roselle drink has flavour similar to cranberry juice and it is ruby red in colour.

The zobo drink are packaged in clean bottles which can be sealed to prevent spoilage .

Hibiscus sabdariffa 
This is the major ingredients used in making zobo drink, it is a leafy vegetable  similar to spinach that originate from europe. Hibiscus also known as Roselle is an annual herb that can be planted all year round especially between November to the April of the next year.

Hibiscus sabdariffa is otherwise known as s spinach dock, sour grass or sour grabs.

Other names 
Zobo drink is also known as hibiscus tea, hibiscus drink and  Roselle drinks because the beverage drink is gotten from hibiscus leaves. Also it is known as local Chapman since other fruits and artificial colours are added. Due to the sour taste of zobo drink, it is refer to as sour tea as well.

Other drinks 
Kunu made from Millet, tiger nut drink and ginger drink are other local drinks  in Nigeria enjoyed by citizens of Nigeria.

Preservatives 
There are two types of preservatives used in production of zobo tea, the natural ones are the nutmeg, lime and cloves which keeps the drink fresh .

0.1% of sodium benzoate or mixture of citric acid and magnesium sulfate are the chemical compounds used in preserving zobo drink for a longer time and make it carbon-free. The artificial preservatives are neutralized with fruit juice in order to conserve the sour taste of the leaf during production.

See also 
 Hibiscus
 Roselle (plant)
 Hibiscus tea
 Hausa cuisine
 Nigerian cuisine

References

External Links 
 Video: How to make Sobolo

African drinks
Burkinabé cuisine
Caribbean drinks
Egyptian cuisine
Ghanaian cuisine
Ivorian cuisine
Mexican drinks
Nigerian drinks
Senegalese cuisine